Nothing Fixed or Final, released in 2005 under Franciscus Henri Productions, is a collection of songs and poems written by poet Sydney Carter, performed by Franciscus Henri.

Track listing

Songs
The Candle Light
Bell of Creation
My Mum was a Woman
Silver in The Stubble
Mixed-up Old Man
Coming and Going Away
Green Like The Leaves
Feeling Sad and Lonely
Creator of The Living
Crow on The Cradle
Bird of Heaven
Shake and Shiver
Lord of The Dance
Come Holy Harlequin
The Devil
Every Star Shall Sing a Carol
Travel on
Julian of Norwich

Poems
Run The Film Backwards
Child
The Burden
The Rat Race
The Sin of Being
Anonymous
Interview

References

2005 albums
Franciscus Henri albums